Vernon Sylvaine (1896–1957) was a British playwright and screenwriter. He is known for writing several popular stage farces. He began working in film in 1937 when his stage hit Aren't Men Beasts! was turned into a film of the same title starring Robertson Hare and Alfred Drayton. Hare and Drayton starred in two further adaptations of his plays A Spot of Bother (1938) and Women Aren't Angels (1943). He adapted his own play for the 1943 comedy-thriller Warn That Man  starring Gordon Harker, Basil Radford and Judy Kelly. His 1948 play One Wild Oat was turned into a 1951 film of the same title.

He was the father of the actress June Sylvaine.

Selected filmography
 Aren't Men Beasts! (1937)
 Make It Three (1938)

Selected plays
 Aren't Men Beasts!
 A Spot of Bother
 Nap Hand (1940)
 Women Aren't Angels (1941)
 Warn That Man! (1941)
 Madame Louise (1945)
 One Wild Oat (1948)
 Will Any Gentleman? (1950)
 As Long as They're Happy (1953)

References

Bibliography
 Murphy, Robert. British Cinema and the Second World War. A&C Black, 2005.

External links

1896 births
1957 deaths
Theatre people from Greater Manchester
British male screenwriters
British writers
20th-century British screenwriters